W. Stanley Hanson (1883–1945) was a photographer, ethnographer, and trusted friend of the Miccosukee and Seminole tribes in South Florida. He served as tax collector and commissioner in Lee County, Florida. The Smithsonian Institution has a collection of his photographs. He also wrote about them and collected artworks from the tribes. He served as Federal Inspector of Birds.

His father, William Hanson (1842–1911), was a doctor in Ft. Myers who treated tribe members. Dr. William Hanson's wife Julia Allen Hanson (1843–1934) was also prominent in Ft. Myers.

Stanley corresponded with Ernest Coe. He was involved in development of the Tamiami Trail connecting Southwest and Southeast Florida via a road through the Everglades.

His son, W. Stanley Hanson, Jr. died October 5, 2005. In 1975, he was interviewed about his father's life experiences as well as his own.

Historian Woody Hanson is a descendant of the family.

The state archives of Florida have a photograph of him.

References

American photographers

1883 births
1945 deaths